"Separate Ways (Worlds Apart)" is a song performed by Journey, recorded for their album Frontiers and released as a single on January 5, 1983. It peaked at #8 for six consecutive weeks on the Billboard Hot 100 chart, and spent four weeks at No. 1 on the Top Tracks chart. The song is also well known for its use in the film Tron: Legacy, in season 4 of Stranger Things and as the theme music for WWE's trademark show Raw.

To accompany the song on MTV, the band shot its first concept video. It was a difficult experience for a variety of reasons, and received mixed reviews from critics.

Background and writing
The song was written and composed in 1982 during the Escape tour. It is not certain exactly when it was first performed live. Some sources will claim that the first live performance of the song was in 1982 at the Day on the Green concert, where singer Steve Perry told the crowd, "We just wrote this song about two weeks ago." However, bootleg recordings exist of performances at least a month earlier at Chicago's Rosemont Horizon, where Perry also says the song was two weeks old.

There were some minor differences in the lyrics on this live debut compared to the final version found on Frontiers. In a 2008 interview, guitarist Neal Schon recalled the first time it was played live:

"Usually we don't write songs that far in advance of an album," observed Jonathan Cain, the band's keyboardist, as Andy Secher, in his article "Adventures in Frontierland," published in the June 1983 issue of Hit Parader Magazine, quoted him. "But on that occasion, Steve [Perry] and I were just working an idea backstage and it all came together. He was working on a bass and I had a guitar, and we just worked out the melody that night and the lyrics the next afternoon. Sometimes you can get lucky and have a song fall together like that."

Schon said that the song was, like many other songs by the band, "Motown mixed with R&B and blues ... that's pretty much where 'Separate Ways' is coming from. It's got a heavier guitar than an R&B song, but I think that's what makes it sound like Journey."Cain said the same thing in 1983:

Music video
The music video for "Separate Ways" was the first single for which the band shot a choreographed video: previous videos were performances that were taped and edited, expanded with "Faithfully" to include a montage of the band on tour shot by a crew from NFL Films. Steve Perry had been very opposed to making a choreographed video. "He'd always say, 'We're performers, we're entertainers, but we're not actors,'" recalled Cain. "And we were not a very photogenic band."

In the video, which used the shorter single version, the band performs the song while a young woman in a white jacket and black leather skirt walks along the wharf. At some points, Perry and the other members of the band perform right next to her, and seem to be singing to her, but she remains oblivious. In the ending, she is seen in a bed, wearing headphones. John Diaz, the producer, explains that the idea was that she had dreamed the video after falling asleep while listening to the song. "Our concepts were so inane."

The video is now infamous for the scenes where the band is pretending to play non-existent instruments, although they do also play their real instruments (including Cain playing his Roland Jupiter-8 "up-the-wall"). It features over 50 camera moves with choreography by Columbia Records Art and Creative Services.

It was reported that on the first day of shooting, there was a cold breeze coming off the Mississippi River next to the wharf. This made filming all the more difficult on the band and Perry, who was seen retreating to his camper to keep warm. This state of affairs was complicated by the presence of Perry's then-girlfriend, Sherrie Swafford, on the set. Not only had the band been told that they could not bring wives or girlfriends to the shoot, the other members hated Swafford and her effect on Perry, which created considerable tension. She was reportedly very jealous of the young woman in the video, local model Margaret Olmstead.  She kept demanding Olmstead be taken out of it. "There was a big kicking and screaming session," Cain recalled later. "Sherrie was giving Steve a very bad time about that girl." Perry had also just gotten his hair cut short, which Cain found inexplicable since the singer's previous hairstyle had been "rockin'."

"Here's a band at their commercial peak," says Adam Dubin, director of many well-received videos, "and some idiot decided to film them on a wharf and--here's the worst part--instead of giving them instruments, let them mime playing imaginary instruments. The director should be shot. And the manager should be shot for allowing his band to be put in this position."

A decade later, it was heavily criticized by Beavis and Butt-Head, both voiced by Mike Judge, who opined that the video "sucks" and was "horrible," and ridiculed Perry and Schon's fashion sense. This greatly upset Cain, since he felt Journey's videos had helped make MTV. He called the band's manager repeatedly to ask how they could stop the channel from reairing the segment. In 1999 MTV chose it as 13th on its list of the 25 Worst Videos of All Time.

"I'm at a loss to explain that video," said Cain. "I will never live down those air keyboards. No matter what else I've done in my career, sooner or later people find a way to ask me about the 'Separate Ways' video."

The video is a popular video to make shot-by-shot recreations of.  During the COVID-19 epidemic, a family made a recreation of the Journey video that quickly became popular.

Stranger Things version
For the fourth season of the TV series Stranger Things, which has used songs from the 1980s on its soundtrack, Bryce Miller and Alloy Tracks remixed the song. A fan of the show, Steve Perry heard the remix and told Miller and Troy MacCubbin how much he liked it. Perry told Variety, "I was stunned at how cool it was." Soon after that Perry suggested an extended version which he worked on with Miller.

Daughtry Version

Chart performance

Weekly charts

Year-end charts

See also

 Journey discography
 List of number-one mainstream rock hits (United States)

References

External links
 

1982 songs
1983 singles
Journey (band) songs
Songs written by Steve Perry
Songs written by Jonathan Cain
Song recordings produced by Mike Stone (record producer)
Columbia Records singles
Songs about heartache